John Tonge was an MP for Leicester in 1407.

References

15th-century English people
Year of birth unknown
Year of death unknown